Swamy is an Indian surname that is used to refer to many people including the following.

It is used as a part of the name of many Hindu Gods for example, Venkateswara Swamy, Padmanabha Swamy, Chennakesava Swamy etc.

Swamy is also used to address elders and Saints, Sanyasis (monks, ascetics) etc. Swamyji, Swamy ji and Swamiji are also used. ji is a suffix that is used to denote respect. Swamy means Master, owner etc. and the feminine equivalent word is Swamyni or Swamini.

 Arvind Swamy, Tamil actor
 B. G. L. Swamy, Indian botanist
 Chandra Swamy, Canadian politician
 Narayan Swamy, Indian social worker
 Narain Swamy, Indian test cricketer
 P. A. V. B. Swamy, statistician
 Puripanda Appala Swamy, Indian writer
 Subramanian Swamy, Indian politician and economist

See also
Swami, a primarily Hindi honorific

Surnames